Badha'a is a sub-district located in Al Makhadir District, Ibb Governorate, Yemen. Badha'a had a population of  3779 as of 2004.

References 

Sub-districts in Al Makhadir District